Đức Giang may refer to several places in Vietnam, including:

Đức Giang, Long Biên, a ward of Long Biên District in Hanoi
Đức Giang, Hoài Đức, a commune of Hoài Đức District in Hanoi
Đức Giang, Bắc Giang, a commune of Yên Dũng District
Đức Giang, Hà Tĩnh, a commune of Vũ Quang District